Kevin Grubb (April 19, 1978 – May 6, 2009) was an American race car driver from Mechanicsville, Virginia. He was the younger brother of former race car driver Wayne Grubb. He was under suspension from NASCAR competition due to two violations in NASCAR's substance abuse policy at the time of his death.

NASCAR Cup Series
Grubb's only attempt in the Cup Series came in 2002 when he attempted the Pontiac Excitement 400 at Richmond. He drove the #54 Toys "R" Us Chevy for Team Bristol Motorsports, but was unable to get into the race. During his qualifying attempt he spun out on his second lap and without any owner points was the only car not to make the race. The team was supposed to attempt the 2003 season full-time, with Grubb running for rookie of the year, but the plans fell through.

Busch Series
Grubb's stint in NASCAR's junior series begin in 1997, with four starts with his father's team Grubb Motorsports. His first start came in the #82 Virginia is for Lovers Chevy where he finished 38th at New Hampshire. His first three starts ended in accidents. In his final start of the year, he finished his fourth start in the 21st position at Dover. In 1998, he ran 16 Busch series races for Grubb Motorsports. He ran well in many of those races with a top finish of second at Dover after getting his first pole. His teammate was his brother Wayne Grubb who also raced for his father's team. After a very successful year, Grubb was offered a ride at Brewco Motorsports in 1999. Grubb raced for Brewco through 2001. He would amass 18 top tens in those three years, with his best points finish of 13th in the 2000 season. Early in the 2002 season, he was tabbed to race for Team Bristol Motorsports, replacing Kelly Denton. The team was plagued by failures, and Grubb was released by the end of the season. In 2003, he signed a partial season deal with Carroll Motorsports. He ran well, but had a series of engine problems and got caught in accidents not of his making. Carroll Motorsports folded at the conclusion of the 2003 season. While heading into the 2004 season, he was scheduled to compete in a handful of races for Team Rensi Motorsports, but failed a substance abuse test in March 2004 (below). 

Following reinstatement in June 2006, he appeared on an entry list for a Busch Series race at Nashville Speedway as the driver of the #56 Mac Hill Motorsports Chevy. There was some initial doubt as to whether or not he was officially reinstated; however, multiple reports stated that a NASCAR official confirmed that he was reinstated. He drove the car in non-companion events the team entered; however, Kevin Lepage was still the driver most race weekends.  He participated in five Busch events before being suspended indefinitely on September 11, 2006.

Camping World Truck Series
Grubb began his career in the NASCAR Truck Series running for the family owned Grubb Motorsports. In 1996, he had two starts in the #55 Virginia is for Lovers Chevy finishing his first start on the lead lap in 18th after starting the race in the 8th position. In his second start, an accident brought his race to an end after just 48 laps. He returned to the series in 1997 for one more start where he finished 13th in an unsponsored Grubb Motorsports Chevy at Nazareth. 

In August 2006, he took over the 15 truck for Billy Ballew Motorsports after Kyle Krisiloff left due to a dispute with Kyle's dad over sponsorship. However, that effort ended with the drug suspension in September 2006.

Substance abuse test

NASCAR's Substance Abuse Policy allows NASCAR to administer drug tests virtually any time, anywhere, based only on "reasonable suspicion." 

Grubb failed a substance abuse test in March 2004, and was inactive until June 2006 when he was reinstated by NASCAR.  One of the conditions of his reinstatement was random, unannounced drug tests, a condition to which he agreed.  He participated in five Busch events before being suspended indefinitely on September 11, 2006, when he refused to take a drug test following a second-lap crash at Richmond. Failure to take the test resulted in automatic suspension.

The next day, Grubb claimed that his failure to take the test was a result of confusion following a concussion suffered during the race, and offered to take a drug test at that time.  He was cleared by the infield hospital following the crash, but was diagnosed with a concussion the next day at a local hospital.  He claimed no memory of the refusal to submit to a drug test.

In a comparable situation, NASCAR driver Shane Hmiel was offered a chance at reinstatement after a second such infraction, under condition that he submit to medical and psychological reviews, and frequent drug testing before reinstatement.  In February, 2007, Hmiel failed a drug test, and was banned for life.

Death
Grubb was found dead at Alpine Motel on May 6, 2009 at 11:30 a.m. according to Henrico County authorities. The Richmond Times-Dispatch reported the cause of death was a self-inflicted gunshot wound to the head.

The police reported no indications of any illegal substances inside the hotel room.

Motorsports career results

NASCAR
(key) (Bold – Pole position awarded by qualifying time. Italics – Pole position earned by points standings or practice time. * – Most laps led.)

Winston Cup Series

Busch Series

Craftsman Truck Series

See also
List of sportspeople sanctioned for doping offences

References

AP Obituary in the Richmond Times-Dispatch

External links
 

1978 births
2009 suicides
People from Mechanicsville, Virginia
Racing drivers from Virginia
NASCAR drivers
American sportspeople in doping cases
Doping cases in auto racing
Suicides by firearm in Virginia